Hong Jinquan (born 23 March 2003) is a Chinese swimmer. He competed in the men's 4 × 200 metre freestyle relay at the 2020 Summer Olympics.

References

External links
 

2003 births
Living people
Chinese male freestyle swimmers
Olympic swimmers of China
Swimmers at the 2020 Summer Olympics
Place of birth missing (living people)
Swimmers at the 2018 Summer Youth Olympics
Youth Olympic gold medalists for China
21st-century Chinese people